Why Shoot the Teacher? is a 1977 Canadian comedy-drama film directed by Silvio Narizzano and starring Bud Cort, Samantha Eggar, Kenneth Griffith, and Chris Wiggins. It is based on a book of the same name by Max Braithwaite.

Plot
The plot is set in 1935, during the Depression. Max Brown (Bud Cort) is an urban east-province Canadian fresh from college who travels to Western Canada to accept a teaching position at a one-room rural schoolhouse in the fictional settlement of Willowgreen, Saskatchewan, because there are no other jobs available.

He decides to live in the school's basement, having to adapt to teaching in the Depression-era rural setting, especially given the bleakness of the settlement. His students at first are rebellious, but it eventually changes to a connection between student and teacher as Max gets into a love for Alice Field (played by Samantha Eggar), going to him for emotional support.

Max barely gets paid and he suffers through the paltry winter of Willowgreen, especially suffering given his physical and emotional isolation in the town, only finding solace in Harris Montgomery (played by Gary Reineke) and Alice Field, who both try to use him to solve their problems of political socialism and her being a war bride of Britain.

Max eventually begins to understand Willowgreen and the rural struggles, as the inspector (Kenneth Griffith) comes in to look at his work, which does not end too well. The school year ends as Max is getting on a train back east, but before the credits roll, he tells us he returned the following September to teach another year at Willowgreen.

Cast
 Bud Cort as Max Brown 
 Samantha Eggar as Alice Field 
 Chris Wiggins as Lyle Bishop 
 Gary Reineke as Harris Montgomery 
 John Friesen as Dave McDougall 
 Michael J. Reynolds as Bert Field 
 Kenneth Griffith as Inspector Woods 
 Scott Swan as Dan Trowbridge

Production notes
Why Shoot the Teacher? was filmed on location at Hanna, Alberta.  The film was produced with the assistance of the Canadian Film Development Corporation.

Reception
James DeFelice won a 1978 Canadian Film Award for the film's adapted screenplay. The film also won the Golden Reel Award for attaining higher box-office gross revenues of that year than any other Canadian film with a gross of $1.8 million.

It was later screened at the 1984 Festival of Festivals as part of Front & Centre, a special retrospective program of artistically and culturally significant films from throughout the history of Canadian cinema.

References

External links
Why Shoot the Teacher? at the Canadian Film Encyclopedia
Why Shoot the Teacher?, movie review at The New York Times
 

1977 films
Canadian comedy-drama films
Canadian Screen Award-winning films
English-language Canadian films
Films set in Saskatchewan
Films shot in Alberta
Films about educators
Films set in 1935
Films directed by Silvio Narizzano
1970s English-language films
1970s Canadian films